Wallie Branston (October 11, 1923 – November 7, 2013) was a Canadian race car driver from Scarborough, Ontario, who was inducted into the Canadian Motorsport Hall of Fame in 1997. Branston was a pioneering stock car driver and later became the official starter at Mosport Park.

References

External links
https://www.racing-reference.info/driver/Wallie_Branston

Racing drivers from Ontario
1923 births
2013 deaths